Adam Artur Krzesiński (born 13 September 1965) is a Polish fencer. He won a bronze medal in the team foil event at the 1992 Summer Olympics and a silver in the same event at the 1996 Summer Olympics.

References

External links
 
 
 

1965 births
Living people
Polish male fencers
Olympic fencers of Poland
Fencers at the 1992 Summer Olympics
Fencers at the 1996 Summer Olympics
Fencers at the 2000 Summer Olympics
Olympic silver medalists for Poland
Olympic bronze medalists for Poland
Olympic medalists in fencing
Fencers from Warsaw
Medalists at the 1992 Summer Olympics
Medalists at the 1996 Summer Olympics
21st-century Polish people
20th-century Polish people